State Route 136 (SR 136) is a  state highway that travels west-to-east through portions of Dade, Walker, Gordon, Murray, Gilmer, Pickens, Dawson, and Hall counties in the northwestern and north-central parts of the U.S. state of Georgia. The highway travels from its western terminus at SR 71 at the Alabama state line, west of Trenton, to its eastern terminus at SR 60 north-northwest of Gainesville.

Route description

SR 136 initially heads east from the Alabama state line, where it continues into Alabama as SR 71 in the direction of Higdon.  After passing the community of Gass, the route descends from about 1,600 feet down to under 1,000 feet elevation via two switchback turns as it approaches Trenton, the county seat of Dade County, which is located in the extreme northwest corner of the state of Georgia, bordering both Alabama and Tennessee.  Just before running through Trenton, SR 136 crosses I-59, and then ascends again via switchbacks out of Trenton in a southerly direction up to an elevation of about 2,000 feet to the western border of Cloudland Canyon State Park, and cuts around the state park to its south to head southeast into Walker County.   Just after crossing into Walker County, the route makes a sharp turn to the north and descends yet again down to an elevation of about 1,000 feet, then heads back east, now called Lookout Mountain Scenic Highway in reference to its proximity to Lookout Mountain in the area.

SR 136 meanders in a southeasterly direction, then intersects US 27/SR 1 just north of LaFayette, is co-signed with these two routes south through LaFayette, then splits off and runs east in the direction of Villanow, briefly running north and forming part of the western border of the Chattahoochee National Forest, then running south to find passable valleys, before cutting east through the national forest area.  Just west of the county line with Whitfield County, the route cuts sharply south to cut through the Johns Mountain Wildlife Management Area, then enters Gordon County in its extreme northwestern corner, crosses I-75, and enters Resaca.  SR 136 continues northeast, then east, out of Resaca and through the northern portion of Gordon County, intersects US 411/SR 61, then briefly crosses through the very southern section of Murray County, just south of Carters Lake, and passes into southern Gilmer County.  There, the route cuts southeast, enters Pickens County, and turns back to the east as it approaches Talking Rock, crossing SR 5/SR 515 just west of Talking Rock.

SR 136 now meanders through the southern foothills of the Blue Ridge Mountains, gradually turning into a northeasterly direction, and crosses into Dawson County and is known as Gold Creek Highway. It again resumes a more southeasterly routing as it becomes briefly concurrent with SR 183 south of Amicalola Falls State Park.  The route continues southeast, passing north of Dawsonville, to which it is connected via a former state route spur, now called Shoal Creek Road, and crosses SR 19/SR 400.  SR 136 heads into Hall County as it crosses the Chestatee River branch of Lake Lanier, and arrives at its eastern terminus when it intersects SR 60 north of Lake Lanier and Gainesville.

Traffic
The Georgia Department of Transportation average annual daily traffic (AADT) numbers for the year 2011 show a variety of average daily traffic load numbers as the route travels across northern Georgia.  Daily vehicle averages start with just under 3,500 vehicle east of the Alabama state line, but quickly rise from over 7,000 to just over 14,000 vehicles west of I-59, with numbers falling rapidly back to around 7,200 vehicles east of I-59, and decreasing closer to the averages seen in the rural areas of the route, namely of around 2,300 vehicles per day as the route approaches Walker County.  Numbers stay in the mid-2,000 range to west of LaFayette, where they increase again into the mid-3,000 range, and reach their maximum as SR 136 is concurrent with US 27/SR 1, where averages reach just over 15,000 vehicles per day.  East of the concurrency the vehicle load deceases to around 6,000 vehicles, going down to around 3,000 vehicles as the route runs through the Chattahoochee National Forest.

As SR 136 heads through Walker County, numbers again decrease to between 1,500 and 2,000 vehicles per day, increasing to between 3,000 and 4,000 vehicles in the vicinity of I-75 in Gordon County.  East of I-75, the vehicle load returns to the rural average numbers of around 2,000 vehicles, not increasing again markedly until west of SR 5/SR 515, where the route feeds nearly 4,000 vehicles into the south-to-north route.  East of SR 5, average numbers really drop, going from 1,700 all the way down to a route low of 370 in the western portion of Dawson County.  Averages briefly increase to around 2,500 as the route is concurrent with SR 183, rise to around 3,100 north of Dawsonville,  then fall as low as 1,400, but rise once again as SR 400 is approaching.  Once in Hall County, the route sees a spike in its last few miles as it meets SR 60, where average vehicle numbers as just below 6,400 vehicles per day.

History

1920s
The highway that would eventually become SR 136 was established at least as early as 1919 as SR 1 from LaFayette to Trenton. By the end of 1921, SR 1 was shifted to the east. Also, SR 53 was indicated to be a "contingent road" from LaFayette to Calhoun, with a concurrency with SR 1 in LaFayette. By the end of 1926, the portion of SR 53 northwest of Calhoun and in the city was under construction. The decade ended with the path of SR 53 west of Calhoun shifted to the south. Its LaFayette–Villanow segment was redesignated as part of SR 2.

1930s
In 1930, the portion of SR 2 from approximately Naomi to Villanow had a completed semi hard surface. In February 1932, this segment's east end was shifted slightly north. A few months later, SR 43 was established on a segment northwest of Juno. Just over two years later, SR 2 was extended northwest to an undetermined point northwest of LaFayette. In early 1937, SR 143 was designated on SR 53's former path from Villanow to Calhoun. SR 136 was established from SR 43 northwest of Dawsonville to Gainesville. Later that year, SR 2 northwest of LaFayette was extended farther from the city. The southeast part was under construction, while the northwest part had completed grading, but was not surfaced. By the middle of 1939, SR 2 was extended farther to the northwest, to its intersection with SR 157. The western two-thirds of this segment had completed grading, but was not surfaced. The year ended with SR 2 being extended north-northwest to US 11/SR 58 in Trenton, with the eastern part under construction. SR 156 was established on a path from US 411/SR 61 just north of the Gordon–Murray county line to SR 154 in Blaine. Also, SR 154 was established from SR 156 in Blaine to SR 5 in Talking Rock.

1940s
In early 1940, this last extension of SR 2 had completed grading, but was not surfaced. In the middle part of the year, the portion of SR 2 both north-northwest and east-southeast of the SR 157 intersection had a completed hard surface. Also, SR 154, from Blaine to Talking Rock, was under construction. At the end of the year, SR 154 was established on an alignment from SR 108 northeast of Jasper to SR 183 northwest of Dawsonville. A few months later, nearly the entire portion of SR 2 from just southeast of Cooper Heights to a point just south-southeast of Trenton, as well as a small portion of SR 136 north-northwest of the SR 154/SR 183 intersection, had a completed hard surface. Around the middle of the year, the portion of SR 154 from northeast of Jasper to northwest of Dawsonville was under construction. The year ended with SR 136's segment from the SR 154/SR 183 intersection to SR 9 northeast of Dawsonville being under construction. In 1942, SR 154 from Blaine to Talking Rock had completed grading, but was not surfaced. SR 136 north-northwest of Gainesville had a completed hard surface. By the end of 1946, SR 2 was extended west-southwest to the Alabama state line. SR 154 was redesignated as part of SR 136. The segment of SR 2 from LaFayette to Villanow, the entire length of the former SR 154, and the portion of SR 136 northwest of Emma, was hard surfaced. By the end of 1948, SR 2 west-southwest of Trenton, as well as the entire western segment of SR 143, had a "sand clay, top soil, or stabilized earth" surface. Also, SR 136, from SR 108 northeast of Jasper to SR 183 northwest of Emma, had completed grading, but was not surfaced. The next year, SR 2 was shifted to a much more northern routing; its former alignment from the Alabama state line to Villanow was redesignated as a western extension of SR 143. Also, the portion of SR 143 northwest of LaFayette was hard surfaced.

1950s
By the middle of 1950, a portion of SR 143 just east-southeast of Trenton was hard surfaced. In 1953, the portion of this highway west-southwest of Trenton, its portion from Sugar Valley to Calhoun, and the entire Hall County portion of SR 136, were all hard surfaced. By the middle of 1955, the Gordon County segment of the Villanow–Sugar Valley segment had completed grading, but was not surfaced. About two years later, SR 136 was truncated to a point between Murrayville and Gainesville. Its former path into Gainesville was redesignated as part of SR 60. Two portions of SR 136 were hard surfaced: from north-northeast of Jasper to northeast of Dawsonville and from west-southwest of Murrayville to northwest of Gainesville.

1960s
By the end of 1960, the entire segment of SR 143, from the Alabama state line to Calhoun, was paved. The segment of SR 156 from US 411/SR 61 north of Oakman to just east of the Murray–Gilmer county line had a "topsoil or gravel, unpaved" surface; its entire Pickens County portion was paved. By the time 1963 ended, SR 136, from US 19/SR 9 northeast of Dawsonville to west-southwest of Murrayville, had completed grading, but was not surfaced. In the middle of the decade, an unnumbered road was built from SR 143 northwest of Sugar Valley to Resaca, then east to SR 225 at a point north-northeast of Calhoun. By the end of 1968, SR 136 from northeast of Dawsonville to west-southwest of Murrayville was hard surfaced. The next year, the unnumbered road was extended east of US 411/SR 61 north of Oakman.

1970s and 1980s
In 1972, SR 143 Conn. was established on the previously unnumbered road from SR 143 northwest of Sugar Valley to US 41/SR 3 in Resaca. In 1977, SR 143 (from the Alabama state line to northwest of Sugar Valley) and the entire length of SR 143 Conn. were redesignated as part of SR 136. It was also designated on the previously unnumbered road from Resaca to north of Oakman. SR 156 was shifted to a completely different alignment; its former path from north of Oakman to Blaine was also redesignated as part of SR 136. In 1980, SR 136's two segments were connected, closing the gap from northwest of Talking Rock to northeast of Jasper.

Major intersections

Special routes

Calhoun connector

State Route 136 Connector (SR 136 Conn.) is a  connecting route in Calhoun. It connects SR 136 northwest of Sugar Valley with SR 53 Spur in Calhoun. The roadway that would eventually become SR 136 Conn. was designated as SR 53 by the end of 1921. Its path between LaFayette and Calhoun was indicated to be a "contingent road". It also was indicated to have a brief concurrency with SR 1 in LaFayette. By the end of 1926, the portion of SR 53 northwest of Calhoun, and the portion in the city itself, was under construction. By the end of 1929, the portion of SR 53 west of Calhoun was shifted southward. In early 1937, SR 143 was established on SR 53's former path from Villanow to Calhoun. Between 1946 and early 1948, this segment of SR 143 had a "sand clay, top soil, or stabilized earth" surface. In 1953, the portion of the highway from Sugar Valley to Calhoun was hard surfaced. By the middle of 1955, the Gordon County segment of the segment from Villanow to Sugar Valley had completed grading, but was not surfaced. By the end of 1960, the segment of SR 143 from Villanow to Calhoun was hard surfaced. In 1972, SR 143 Conn. was established from SR 143 northwest of Sugar Valley to US 41/SR 3 in Resaca. In 1977, the entire path of SR 143 from northwest of Sugar Valley to Calhoun was redesignated as SR 136 Conn., as all of SR 143 and SR 143 Conn. were decommissioned.

Hinton connector

State Route 136 Connector (SR 136 Conn.) is a  connecting route in Pickens County. It travels northeast from SR 53 in Hinton to the SR 136 mainline in Blaine. The roadway that would eventually become SR 136 Conn. was established in late 1939 as part of SR 156 from SR 154 in Blaine to SR 53 in Hinton. In early 1941, this segment of SR 156 had a "completed hard surface". By the end of 1960, it was paved. In 1977, SR 156 was shifted onto a totally different alignment; its former path from Blaine to Hinton was redesignated as SR 136 Conn.

Dawsonville spur route

State Route 136 Spur (SR 136 Spur) was a spur route of SR 136 that existed in Dawson County. SR 136 Spur was established between 1960 and the end of 1963 from SR 53 in Dawsonville to SR 136 north-northwest of the city. In 1982, SR 136 Spur was decommissioned.

See also

 List of highways numbered 136

References

External links

136
Transportation in Dade County, Georgia
Transportation in Walker County, Georgia
Transportation in Gordon County, Georgia
Transportation in Murray County, Georgia
Transportation in Gilmer County, Georgia
Transportation in Pickens County, Georgia
Transportation in Dawson County, Georgia
Transportation in Hall County, Georgia